Michael Arthur Chagares (born May 1, 1962) is the chief judge of the United States Court of Appeals for the Third Circuit.

Education
Chagares received his Bachelor of Arts degree from Gettysburg College in 1984 and his Juris Doctor from Seton Hall University School of Law in 1987.

Legal career
Chagares began his legal career as a law clerk for Judge Morton Ira Greenberg of the United States Court of Appeals for the Third Circuit from 1987 to 1988. Chagares was in private practice the next two years before joining the United States Department of Justice as an assistant United States attorney in 1990. He rose to become chief of the Civil Division for the U.S. Attorney's Office for the District of New Jersey in 1999, but left the Justice Department in 2004 to return to private practice in New Jersey.

Since 1991, Chagares has been an adjunct professor at Seton Hall University School of Law.

Federal judicial service
Chagares was nominated to the Third Circuit by President George W. Bush on January 25, 2006 to fill the seat vacated by Michael Chertoff, who resigned to become Secretary of Homeland Security. Chagares's nomination moved unusually swiftly through the United States Senate, and he was confirmed just over two months later on April 4, 2006 by a 98–0 vote. He received his commission on April 20, 2006. On November 17, 2021, it was announced that Chagares will become the next Chief Judge of the Third Circuit, effective on December 4, 2021.

References

External links

 "Prosecutor Bumb picked for U.S. bench; The assistant U.S. attorney's big wins include Milton Milan's conviction", The Philadelphia Inquirer, January 26, 2006

1962 births
Living people
21st-century American judges
American people of Greek descent
Assistant United States Attorneys
Gettysburg College alumni
Judges of the United States Court of Appeals for the Third Circuit
Seton Hall University School of Law alumni
Seton Hall University School of Law faculty
United States court of appeals judges appointed by George W. Bush